Protomyctophum andriashevi is a species of lanternfish which is circumpolar in the Southern Ocean. It is sometimes called Andriashev's lanternfish.

References

Lampanyctus
Fish described in 1963